Dekeyseria brachyura is a species of armored catfish endemic to Brazil where it is found in the lower Rio Negro basin.  This species grows to a length of  TL.

References 
 

Ancistrini
Catfish of South America
Freshwater fish of Brazil
Endemic fauna of Brazil
Fish described in 1854